HMS Pathfinder was the lead ship of her class of two British scout cruisers, and was the first ship ever to be sunk by a self-propelled torpedo fired by submarine (the American Civil War sloop-of-war USS Housatonic had been sunk by a spar torpedo). She was built by Cammell Laird, Birkenhead, launched on 16 July 1904, and commissioned on 18 July 1905.  She was originally to have been named HMS Fastnet, but was renamed prior to construction. During the beginning of World War I, the Pathfinder was sunk on 5 September 1914 by a German U-boat, the SM U-21.

Construction
In May 1902, the British Admiralty issued an invitation to tender to several shipbuilding yards for a new type of small cruiser, intended to act as leaders for flotillas of destroyers. The new ships required high speed to keep up with the destroyers, good seaworthiness and good communications equipment, but as they were only intended to fight destroyer-type vessels, a heavy armament was not specified.

A total of eight scout cruisers were ordered, two each from Armstrong Whitworth, Fairfield, Cammell Laird and Vickers.

The main armament of the Pathfinder class consisted of ten quick-firing (QF) 12-pounder  18-cwt guns. Three guns were mounted abreast on the forecastle and the quarterdeck, with the remaining four guns positioned port and starboard amidships. They also carried eight 3-pounder Hotchkiss guns and two above-water 18-inch (450 mm) torpedo tubes, one on each broadside.

Pathfinder was laid down at Cammell Laird's Birkenhead shipyard on 15 August 1903, was launched on 16 July 1904 and completed on 18 July 1905.

Career
Not long after completion, two additional 12 pounder guns were added and the 3 pounder guns were replaced with six 6 pounder guns.  In 1911–12 they were rearmed with nine 4-inch guns.  Pathfinder spent her early career with the Atlantic Fleet, Channel Fleet (1906) and then the Home Fleet (1907). At the start of the First World War she was part of the 8th Destroyer Flotilla based at Rosyth in the Firth of Forth and commanded by Capt Francis Martin-Leake.

Pathfinder was sunk off St. Abbs Head, Berwickshire, Scotland, on Saturday 5 September 1914 by the German U-21, commanded by Kapitänleutnant Otto Hersing.  The ship was struck in a magazine, which exploded, causing the ship to sink within minutes with the loss of 259 men.

Sinking

At the beginning of September 1914, Otto Hersing, Commanding Officer of U-21, ventured to the Firth of Forth, home to the major British naval base at Rosyth. Hersing is known to have penetrated the Firth of Forth as far as the Carlingnose Battery beneath the Forth Bridge.  At one point the periscope was spotted and the battery opened fire but without success.  Overnight Hersing withdrew from the Forth, patrolling the coast from the Isle of May southwards.  On the morning of 5 September, he observed HMS Pathfinder on a SSE course, followed by elements of the 8th Destroyer Flotilla.  At midday, the destroyers altered course back towards the Isle of May while Pathfinder continued her patrol. Shortly thereafter, Hersing spotted Pathfinder on her return journey through his periscope and resolved to make an attack.

At 1543 U-21 fired a single  Type G/6 torpedo at a range of 2,000 yards. At 1545 lookouts spotted a torpedo wake heading towards the starboard bow and the officer of the watch, Lieutenant-Commander Favell, attempted to take evasive action by ordering the starboard engine be put astern and the port engine at full ahead while the wheel was turned hard a port, the manoeuvre was not in time and the torpedo struck the ship beneath the bridge. The detonation apparently set off cordite bags in the forward magazine which caused a second, more massive explosion within the fore section of the ship, essentially destroying everything forward of the bridge. Broken in two, the Pathfinder instantly began sinking, dragging most of her crew down with her and leaving a massive pall of smoke to mark her grave. The vessel sank so quickly, in fact, that there was insufficient time to launch lifeboats. (Indeed, the remains of a lifeboat davit and rope can still be seen on the wreck, demonstrating the speed with which the vessel sank.)

One survivor of the sinking, Acting Sub-Lieutenant Edward Oliver Sonnenschein, described the sinking as such:

Also among the survivors was staff surgeon Thomas Aubrey Smyth, who lived at Bedeque House in Dromore, Co Down.

Recounting the experience in a letter to his mother, he said the explosion had blown a "great hole in the side of the ship".

"I was at the time in the wardroom, but ran up on deck immediately, and it was then evident by the way the bow was down in the water that she would sink rapidly," he said.

"I was then thrown forward by the slope of the deck and got jammed beneath a gun (which I expect is the cause of my bruising) and while in this position was carried down some way by the sinking ship, but fortunately after a time I became released and after what seemed like interminable ages I came to the surface, and after swimming a short time I was able to get an oar and some other floating material with the help of which I was just able to keep on the surface."

Fishing boats from the nearby fishing port of Eyemouth were the first on the scene and encountered a field of debris, fuel oil, clothing and body parts. Additionally, the British destroyers HMS Stag and Express had spotted the smoke and headed for the pall of smoke, only to find that what few survivors there were had already been rescued. (There was an anecdotal story that one of the destroyers had an engine problem when a water inlet was blocked by a leg in a seaboot.)

There is significant confusion regarding the numbers of survivors.  On 6 September The Times declared that 58 men had been rescued but that four had died of injuries.  The fact that it is impossible to determine how many were on board that day adds to the problem, but modern research indicates that in all probability, there were 268 personnel on board plus two civilian canteen assistants. There were just twenty known survivors.

Four more men died of injuries or exposure and are buried at Dalmeny in Fife and Warriston near Edinburgh.  One unknown Pathfinder sailor is buried at Dunbar overlooking the scene of the sinking.

The explosion was seen by British writer Aldous Huxley (while staying at Northfield House, St. Abbs) who recorded the following in a letter to his father sent on 14 September 1914:

I dare say Julian told you that we actually saw the Pathfinder explosion – a great white cloud with its foot in sea.

The St. Abbs' lifeboat came in with the most appalling accounts of the scene. There was not a piece of wood, they said, big enough to float a man—and over acres the sea was covered with fragments—human and otherwise. They brought back a sailor's cap with half a man's head inside it. The explosion must have been frightful. It is thought to be a German submarine that did it, or, possibly, a torpedo fired from one of the refitted German trawlers, which cruise all round painted with British port letters and flying the British flag.

Despite the events of 5 September having been easily visible from shore, the authorities attempted to cover up the fact that Pathfinder had been sunk by a torpedo, insisting instead that it had struck a mine. The reason for this is unclear, but probably has to do with the Admiralty's position that submarines — a still new and largely untested weapons platform — lacked the capacity to sink a surface warship with a torpedo. A local paper, however, The Scotsman, published an eye-witness account by an Eyemouth fisherman, who had assisted in the rescue, that confirmed rumors that a submarine had been responsible. (However The Scotsman also reported that Pathfinder had been attacked by two U-boats and had accounted for the second one in her death throes. Admiralty intelligence later claimed that cruisers had cornered the U-boat responsible and shelled it to oblivion.) The sinking of Pathfinder by a submarine made both sides aware of the potential vulnerability of large ships to attack by submarines.

Notes

Footnotes

Works cited

General references

Further reading
ADM 116/1356 List of Pathfinder dead
ADM 137/3106 Reported presence of enemy submarine in Firth of Forth

External links
 
Pathfinder class in World War I
History of the Pathfinder class
List of Casualties

 

 

Pathfinder-class cruisers
World War I cruisers of the United Kingdom
Maritime incidents in September 1914
Ships sunk by German submarines in World War I
World War I shipwrecks in the North Sea
Ships built on the River Mersey
1904 ships
Naval magazine explosions